Lamont School of Music is the school of arts of the University of Denver, based in city of Denver, United States. In 1941, the school merged with the University of Denver.

History 

Despite its separation from Denver University's main campus for many years, the Lamont School of Music persevered, and was poised for expansion and development. Both followed with the appointment of the school's fifth director, F. Joseph Docksey. In 1988, the Lamont School of Music's enrollment totaled 116 music majors at both the graduate and undergraduate levels; by 2001, enrollment jumped to 256; and by 2007, the school had reached its strategic enrollment cap of 300 music majors. In February 2004, the Lamont School of Music was recognized by the city of Denver with the Mayor's Award for Excellence in the Arts. In February 2005, the Lamont School of Music was recognized by the city of Denver with the Mayor's Award for Excellence in the Arts.  2011 marked the appointment of Lamont's sixth director, Nancy Cochran.

Former locations 
The school is named after its founder, Florence Lamont Hinman (née Lamont; 1888–1964), a teacher of voice and piano.  In 1922, upon the death of Margaret Berger (née Kountze), widow of William B. Berger (1839–1890), Lamont moved her school into the Berger house at 1170 Sherman Street, Denver, where it was used as a conservatory until 1941, when the Lamont School merged with the University of Denver and moved into the former home of John Sidney Brown (1833–1913) at 909 Grant Street. Hinman continued to direct the school until her retirement in 1952.  The Berger mansion was demolished in 1942 and the Brown mansion was demolished in 1968.

Faculty and alumni

Notable faculty
Robert Davine (Professor of Accordion and Music Theory, 1924 - 2001) - established one of the three major academic programs at the college level for the accordion within the United States as part of a course of study culminating in an Artist Diploma in Concert Accordion Performance in the late 1950's.
Ricardo Iznaola (Professor Emeritus of Guitar; Professor of Guitar from 1983-2015; former Chair of the Guitar and Harp Department and former Director of the Conservatory Program)
 Sean Friar (Chair of Composition Department) - Recipient of the 2011 Rome Prize in Music Composition.

Notable alumni
Jean Dickenson

References

External links
Lamont School of Music at University of Denver

Music schools in Colorado
Music of Denver
Education in Denver
University of Denver
1922 establishments in Colorado